Vietnam does not recognize same-sex marriages, civil unions, domestic partnerships, unregistered cohabitation, or any other form of recognition for same-sex couples.

Legal history
Same-sex marriage is not recognized in Vietnam, despite attempts at legalisation in 2013 and 2014. In 2013, the Government of Vietnam announced it would no longer fine people who carry out public same-sex wedding ceremonies; however, these unions have no legal recognition, and as such same-sex couples are unable to access the rights and benefits of marriage, including social security, inheritance, adoption, common ownership of property and goods, tax benefits, etc.

Background
Attempts to hold unofficial same-sex marriages in the late 1990s were met with mixed reactions from the government. A male couple held a ceremony in Ho Chi Minh City in 1997. One official stated, "It should be publicly condemned." However, the police said that there was no legal framework under which the two men could be charged. Another attempt in 1998 by a lesbian couple in the province of Vĩnh Long, however, was officially sanctioned. The Ministry of Justice intervened and ordered the annulment of the union, stating it was "illegal and runs counter to the morals and traditional customs of the Vietnamese nation." A law was passed three months later officially banning same-sex unions in Vietnam.

Previous laws against all forms of cohabitation were repealed under a new marriage law approved by the National Assembly in 2000.

Legal situation

Article 64 of the Constitution of Vietnam adopted in 1992 stated that: "The family is the cell of society. The State protects marriage and the family. Marriage shall conform to the principles of free consent, progressive union, monogamy, and equality between husband and wife. Parents have the responsibility to bring up their children into good citizens. Children and grandchildren have the duty to show respect to and look after their parents and grandparents. The State and society shall recognise no discrimination among children." Article 36(1) of the 2013 Vietnamese Constitution is similar, reading:

While the Constitution notes that men and women are equal in marriage and have the right to marry, it does not explicitly ban the recognition of same-sex marriages. The Institute for Studies of Society, Economy and Environment states that Article 36 does not stipulate that marriage is between a man and a woman and the "principle of monogamy" mentioned in the article also does not imply a ban on same-sex unions.

Article 10(5) of the Law on Marriage and Family contained an explicit ban on same-sex marriage. In 2014, the National Assembly removed that ban and enacted the following provision in Article 8(2): "the State shall not recognize marriage between persons of the same sex".

Legalization attempts
In May 2012, a same-sex couple in Hà Tiên held a traditional, public wedding at their home but were stopped by local authorities. The event was widely reported on Vietnamese media and started a heated debate on the issue. Two months later, the Minister of Justice, Hà Hùng Cường, announced that the government was considering legalising same-sex marriage, stating that "in order to protect individual freedoms, same-sex marriage should be allowed." The matter was expected to be debated in the National Assembly in spring 2013. However, in February 2013, the Ministry of Justice requested that the National Assembly avoid action until 2014.

In June 2013, the Ministry of Justice submitted a bill to remove the same-sex marriage ban from the Law on Marriage and Family, and provide some legal rights to cohabiting same-sex couples. The National Assembly debated the bill in October 2013. On 27 May 2014, the National Assembly's Committee for Social Affairs removed the provisions giving legal rights to cohabiting same-sex couples from the legislation. The bill was approved by the National Assembly on 19 June 2014, promulgated by President Trương Tấn Sang on 26 June, and took effect on 1 January 2015, but without provisions recognizing same-sex unions. The law removed the same-sex marriage ban in Article 10(5) of the Law on Marriage and Family and enacted a provision in Article 8(2) that Vietnam does not "recognize marriage between persons of the same sex". Nguyễn Anh Tuấn, the head of a gay tourist agency in Hanoi, told NBC News, "It's not perfect… It's not completely there but it is a great step in the right direction."

On 24 September 2013, the government issued a decree abolishing the penalty for holding same-sex marriage ceremonies. The decree took effect on 11 November 2013. Since that date, the government no longer imposes fines on people who carry out public same-sex weddings.

On 22 January 2019, at the country’s third Universal Periodic Review, Iceland, the Netherlands and Canada recommended Vietnam to legalize same-sex marriage. On 4 July 2019, the government "noted" (rejected) these recommendations.

Public opinion
A survey carried out in December 2012 by the Institute for Studies of Society, Economy and Environment (iSEE) showed that 37% of Vietnam's population supported the legalization of same-sex marriage, while 58% were opposed.

A March 2014 poll by the iSEE found that 33.7% of Vietnamese supported same-sex marriage, while 52.9% were opposed. 41% supported recognizing same-sex cohabition or civil unions. The poll showed that support for same-sex marriage was higher among younger respondents, respondents who have gay friends or family members, and those who have completed higher education. 73% of Vietnamese stated that legalising same-sex marriage would not negatively affect their families, while 20% said it would have a negative impact.

An online survey carried out by the International Lesbian, Gay, Bisexual, Trans and Intersex Association (ILGA) from December 2015 to January 2016 found that 45% of respondents supported the legalization of same-sex marriage, while 25% opposed it.

See also 
LGBT rights in Vietnam
Recognition of same-sex unions in Asia

Notes

References 

LGBT rights in Vietnam
Vietnam